The Technical University of Berlin (official name both in English and , also known as TU Berlin and Berlin Institute of Technology) is a public research university located in Berlin, Germany. It was the first German university to adopt the name "Technische Universität" (Technical University).

The university alumni and staff includes several US National Academies members, two National Medal of Science laureates, the father of the modern computer, Konrad Zuse, and ten Nobel Prize laureates.

TU Berlin is a member of TU9, an incorporated society of the largest and most notable German institutes of technology and of the Top International Managers in Engineering network, which allows for student exchanges between leading engineering schools. It belongs to the Conference of European Schools for Advanced Engineering Education and Research. The TU Berlin is home of two innovation centers designated by the European Institute of Innovation and Technology. The university is labeled as "The Entrepreneurial University" ("Die Gründerhochschule") by the Federal Ministry for Economic Affairs and Energy.

The university is notable for having been the first to offer a degree in Industrial Engineering and Management (Wirtschaftsingenieurwesen). The university designed the degree in response to requests by industrialists for graduates with the technical and management training to run a company. First offered in winter term 1926/27, it is one of the oldest programmes of its kind.

TU Berlin has one of the highest proportions of international students in Germany, almost 27% in 2019.

In addition, TU Berlin is part of the Berlin University Alliance, has been conferred the title of "University of Excellence" under and receiving funding from the German Universities Excellence Initiative.

History

On 1 April 1879, the Königlich Technische Hochschule zu Berlin ("Royal Technical Academy of Berlin") came into being in 1879 through a merger of the Royal Trade Academy (Königliche Gewerbeakademie zu Berlin, founded in 1827) and Royal Building Academy (Königliche Bauakademie zu Berlin, founded in 1799), two predecessor institutions of the Prussian State.

In 1899, the Königlich Technische Hochschule zu Berlin was the first polytechnic in Germany to award doctorates, as a standard degree for the graduates, in addition to diplomas, thanks to professor Alois Riedler and Adolf Slaby, chairman of the Association of German Engineers (VDI) and the Association for Electrical, Electronic and Information Technologies (VDE).

In 1916 the long-standing Königliche Bergakademie zu Berlin, the Prussian mining academy created by the geologist Carl Abraham Gerhard in 1770 at the behest of King Frederick the Great, was incorporated into the Königlich Technische Hochschule as the "Department of Mining". Beforehand, the mining college had been, however, for several decades under the auspices of the Frederick William University (now Humboldt University of Berlin), before it was spun out again in 1860.

After Charlottenburg's absorption into Greater Berlin in 1920 and Germany being turned into Weimar Republic, the Königlich Technische Hochschule zu Berlin was renamed "Technische Hochschule zu Berlin" ("TH Berlin"). In 1927, the Department of Geodesy of the Agricultural College of Berlin was incorporated into the TH Berlin. During the 1930s, the redevelopment and expansion of the campus along the "East-West axis" were part of the Nazi plans of a Welthauptstadt Germania, including a new faculty of defense technology under General Karl Becker, built as a part of the greater academic town (Hochschulstadt) in the adjacent west-wise Grunewald forest. The shell construction remained unfinished after the outbreak of World War II and after Becker's suicide in 1940, it is today covered by the large-scale Teufelsberg rubble hill.

The north section of the main building of the university was destroyed during a bombing raid in November 1943. Due to the street fighting at the end of the Second World War, the operations at the TH Berlin were suspended as of 20 April 1945. Planning for the re-opening of the school began on 2 June 1945, once the acting rectorship led by Gustav Ludwig Hertz and Max Volmer was appointed. As both Hertz and Volmer remained in exile in the Soviet Union for some time to come, the college was not re-inaugurated until 9 April 1946, now bearing the name "Technische Universität Berlin".

Since 2009 the TU Berlin houses two Knowledge and Innovation Communities (KIC) designated by the European Institute of Innovation and Technology.

Name
	
The official policy of the university is that only the German name, Technische Universität Berlin (TU Berlin), should be used abroad in order to promote corporate identity and that its name is not to be translated into English.

Campus

The main campus is located in the borough of Charlottenburg-Wilmersdorf. The seven schools of the university have some 33,933 students enrolled in 90 subjects (October 2015).

From 2012 to 2022, TU Berlin operated a satellite campus in Egypt, the El Gouna campus, to act as a scientific and academic field office. The nonprofit public–private partnership (PPP) aimed to offer services provided by Technische Universität Berlin at the campus in El Gouna on the Red Sea.

The university also has a franchise of its Global Production Engineering coursecalled Global Production Engineering and Management at the Vietnamese-German University in Ho Chi Minh City.

Organization

Since 2002, the TU Berlin has consisted of the following faculties and institutes:
 Faculty I – Humanities and Educational Sciences (Geistes- und Bildungswissenschaften)
 Institute of History and Philosophy of Science, Technology, and Literature
 Institute for Art History and Historical Urbanism
 Institute of Education
 Institute of Language and Communication
 Institute of Vocational Education and Work Studies
Center for Research on Antisemitism (ZfA)
 Center for Interdisciplinary Women's and Gender Studies (ZIFG)
 Center for Cultural Studies on Science and Technology in China (CCST)
 Faculty II – Mathematics and Natural Sciences (Mathematik und Naturwissenschaften)
 Center for Astronomy and Astrophysics
 Institute of Chemistry
 Institute of Solid-State Physics
 Institute of Mathematics
 Institute of Optics and Atomic Physics
 Institute of Theoretical Physics
 Faculty III – Process Sciences (Prozesswissenschaften)
 Institute of Biotechnology
 Institute of Energy Technology
 Institute of Food Technology and Food Chemistry
 Institute of Chemical and Process Engineering
 Institute of Environmental Technology
 Institute of Material Sciences and Technology
 Faculty IV – Electrical Engineering and Computer Science (Elektrotechnik und Informatik)
 Institute of Energy and Automation Technology
 Institute of High-Frequency and Semiconductor System Technologies
 Institute of Telecommunication Systems
 Institute of Computer Engineering and Microelectronics
 Institute of Software Engineering and Theoretical Computer Science
 Institute of Commercial Information Technology and Quantitative Methods
 Faculty V – Mechanical Engineering and Transport Systems (Verkehrs- und Maschinensysteme)
 Institute of Fluid Mechanics and Technical Aacoustics
 Institute of Psychology and Ergonomics (Arbeitswissenschaft)
 Institute of Land and Sea Transport Systems
 Institute of Aeronautics and Astronautics
 Institute of Engineering Design, and Micro and Medical Technology
 Institute of Machine Tools and Factory Management
 Institute of Mechanics
 Faculty VI – Planning Building Environment (Planen Bauen Umwelt)
 Institute of Architecture
 Institute of Civil Engineering
 Institute of Applied Geosciences
 Institute of Geodesy and Geoinformation Science
 Institute of Landscape Architecture and Environmental Planning
 Institute of Ecology
 Institute of Sociology
 Institute of Urban and Regional Planning
 Faculty VII – Economics and Management (Wirtschaft und Management)
 Institute for Technology and Management (ITM)
 Institute of Business Administration (IBWL)
 Institute of Economics and Law (IVWR)
 School of Education (SETUB)
 Central Institute El Gouna (Zentralinstitut El Gouna)

Faculty and staff
As of 2015, 8,455 people work at the university: 338 professors, 2,598 postgraduate researchers, and 2,131 personnel work in administration, the workshops, the library, and the central facilities. In addition, there are 2,651 student assistants and 126 trainees.

International student mobility is available through the ERASMUS programme or through the Top Industrial Managers for Europe (TIME) network.

Library

The new common main library of Technische Universität Berlin and of the Berlin University of the Arts was opened in 2004 and holds about 2.9 million volumes (2007). The library building was sponsored partially (estimated 10% of the building costs) by Volkswagen and is named officially "University Library of the TU Berlin and UdK (in the Volkswagen building)". A source of confusion to many, the letters above the main entrance only state "Volkswagen Bibliothek" (German for "Volkswagen Library") – without any mentioning of the universities.

Some of the former 17 libraries of Technische Universität Berlin and of the nearby University of the Arts were merged into the new library, but several departments still retain libraries of their own. In particular, the school of 'Economics and Management' maintains a library with 340,000 volumes in the university's main building (Die Bibliothek – Wirtschaft & Management/″The Library″ – Economics and Management) and the 'Department of Mathematics' maintains a library with 60,000 volumes in the Mathematics building (Mathematische Fachbibliothek/"Mathematics Library").

Notable alumni and professors

(Including those of the Academies mentioned under History)

 Bruno Ahrends (1878–1948), architect
 Steffen Ahrends (1907–1992), architect
 Stancho Belkovski (1891–1962), Bulgarian architect, head of Higher Technical School in Sofia and the department of public buildings.
 August Borsig (1804–1854), businessman
 Carl Bosch (1874–1940), chemist, Nobel prize winner 1931
 Franz Breisig (1868–1934), mathematician, inventor of the calibration wire and father of the term quadripole network in electrical engineering.
 Wilhelm Cauer (1900–1945), mathematician, essential contributions to the design of filters.
 Henri Marie Coandă (1886–1972), aircraft designer; discovered the Coandă Effect.
 Carl Dahlhaus (1928–1989), musicologist.
 George de Hevesy (1885–1966), chemist, Nobel prize winner 1943
 Walter Dornberger (1895–1980), developer of the Air Force-NASA X-20 Dyna-Soar project.
 Ottmar Edenhofer (born 1961), economist
 Krafft Arnold Ehricke (1917–1984), rocket-propulsion engineer, worked for the NASA, chief designer of the Centaur
 Gerhard Ertl (born 10 October 1936 in Stuttgart) Physicist and Surface Chemist, Hon. Prof. and Nobel prize winner 2007
 Gottfried Feder (1883–1941), economist and key member of the National Socialist Party
 Wigbert Fehse (born 1937) German engineer and researcher in the area of automatic space navigation, guidance, control and docking/berthing.
 Dennis Gabor (1900–1971), physicist (holography), Nobel prize winner 1971
 Fritz Gosslau (1898–1965), German engineer, known for his work at the V-1 flying bomb.
 Fritz Haber (1868–1934), chemist, Nobel prize winner 1918.
 Gustav Ludwig Hertz (1887–1975), physicist, Nobel prize winner 1925
 Fritz Houtermans (1903–1966) atomic and nuclear physicist
 Hugo Junkers (1859–1935), former of Junkers & Co, a major German aircraft manufacturer.
 Anatol Kagan (1913–2009), Russian-born Australian architect.
 Helmut Kallmeyer (1910–2006), German chemist and Action T4 perpetrator
 Walter Kaufmann (1871–1947), physicist, well known for his first experimental proof of the velocity dependence of mass.
 Diébédo Francis Kéré (born 1965), architect
 Nicolas Kitsikis (1887–1978), Greek civil engineer, rector of the Athens Polytechnic School, senator and member of the Greek Parliament, doctor honoris causa of the Technische Universität Berlin.
 Heinz-Hermann Koelle (born 1925) former director of the Army Ballistic Missile Agency, member of the launch crew on Explorer I and later directed the NASA's Marshall Space Flight Center's involvement in Project Apollo.
 Abdul Qadeer Khan (born 1936), Pakistani nuclear physicist and metallurgical engineer, who founded the uranium enrichment program for Pakistan's atomic bomb project.
 Franz Kruckenberg (1882–1965), designer of the first aerodynamic high-speed train 1931
 Karl Küpfmüller (1897–1977), electrical engineer, essential contributions to system theory
 Wassili Luckhardt (1889–1972), architect
 Georg Hans Madelung (1889–1972), a German academic and aeronautical engineer.
 Herbert Franz Mataré (1912–2011), German physicist and Transistor-pioneer
 Alexander Meissner (1883–1958), electrical engineer
 Joachim Milberg (born 1943), Former CEO of BMW AG.
 Erwin Wilhelm Müller (1911–1977), physicist (field emission microscope, field ion microscope, atom probe)
 Klaus-Robert Müller (born 1964), computer scientist and physicist, a leading researcher in machine learning
 Hans-Georg Münzberg (1916–2000), engineer, airplane turbines
 Gustav Niemann (1899–1982), mechanical engineer
 Ida Noddack (1896–1978), nominated three times for Nobel Prize in Chemistry.
 Jakob Karol Parnas (1884–1949), biochemist, Embden-Meyerhof-Parnas pathway
 Wolfgang Paul (1913–1993), physicist, Nobel prize winner 1989
 Franz Reuleaux (1829–1905), mechanical engineer, often called the father of kinematics
 Klaus Riedel (1907–1944), German rocket pioneer, worked on the V-2 missile programme at Peenemünde.
 Alois Riedler (1850–1936), inventor of the Leavitt-Riedler Pumping Engine; proponent of practically-oriented engineering education.
 Hermann Rietschel (1847–1914), inventor of modern HVAC (heating, ventilation, and air conditioning).
 Arthur Rudolph (1906–1996) worked for the U.S. Army and NASA, developer of Pershing missile and the Saturn V Moon rocket.
 Ernst Ruska (1906–1988), physicist (electron microscope), Nobel prize winner 1986
 Karl Friedrich Schinkel (1781–1841), architect (at the predecessor Berlin Building Academy)
 Bernhard Schölkopf (born 1968), computer scientist
 Fritz Sennheiser (1912–2010), founder of Sennheiser
 Adolf Slaby (1849–1913), German wireless pioneer
 Albert Speer (1905–1981), architect, politician, Minister for Armaments during the Third Reich, was sentenced to 20 years prison in the Nuremberg trials
 Ivan Stranski (1897–1979), chemist, considered the father of crystal growth research
 Zdenko Strižić (1902–1990), architect
 Ernst Stuhlinger (1913–2008), member of the Army Ballistic Missile Agency, director of the space science lab at NASA's Marshall Space Flight Center.
 Kurt Tank (1893–1983), head of design department of Focke-Wulf, designed the Fw 190
 Hermann W. Vogel, (1834–1898) photo-chemist
 Wernher von Braun (1912–1977), head of Nazi Germany's V-2 rocket program, saved from prosecution at the Nuremberg Trials by Operation Paperclip, first director of the United States National Aeronautics and Space Administration's (NASA) Marshall Space Flight Center, called the father of the U.S. space program.
 Elisabeth von Knobelsdorff (1877–1959), engineer and architect
 Chaim Weizmann, first President of Israel
 Wilhelm Heinrich Westphal (1882–1978), physicist
 Eugene Wigner (1902–1995), physicist, discovered the Wigner-Ville-distribution, Nobel prize winner 1963
 Ludwig Wittgenstein (1889–1951), philosopher
 Martin C. Wittig (born 1964), Former CEO of the management consultant firm Roland Berger Strategy Consultants.
 Elisa Leonida Zamfirescu (1887–1973) chemist, graduated 1912, female engineering pioneer.
 Günter M. Ziegler (born 1963), Gottfried Wilhelm Leibniz Prize (2001)
 Konrad Zuse (1910–1995), computer pioneer

Rankings

Measured by the number of top managers in the German economy, TU Berlin ranked 11th in 2019.

According to the research report of the German Research Foundation (DFG) from 2018, TU Berlin ranks 24th absolute among German universities across all scientific disciplines. Thereby TU Berlin ranks 9th absolute in natural sciences and engineering. The TU Berlin took 14th place absolute in computer science and 5th place absolute in electrical engineering. In a competitive selection process, the DFG selects the best research projects from researchers at universities and research institutes and finances them. The ranking is thus regarded as an indicator of the quality of research.

In the 2017 Times Higher Education World University Rankings, globally the TU Berlin ranks 82nd overall (7th in Germany), 40th in the field of Engineering & Technology (3rd in Germany) and 36th in Computer science discipline (4th in Germany), making it one of the top 100 universities worldwide in all three measures.

As of 2016, TU Berlin is ranked 164th overall and 35th in the field of Engineering & Technology according to the British QS World University Rankings. It is one of Germany's highest ranked universities in statistics and operations research and in Mathematics according to QS.

See also
 Universities and research institutions in Berlin
 European Institute of Innovation and Technology
 Free University of Berlin
 Humboldt University of Berlin
 Berlin University of the Arts

References

External links
 Official website
 TU Berlin: International partner universities
 Website of the Student's Council and Government
 TU Berlin: Campus Map

 
Technical universities and colleges in Germany
Universities and colleges in Berlin
Buildings and structures in Charlottenburg-Wilmersdorf
Educational institutions established in 1879
Public universities
Engineering universities and colleges in Germany
1879 establishments in Germany